Moment of Truth is a 2007 blues album by Tinsley Ellis. It was recorded by Tony Terrebonne, mixed by Sam Fishkin, mastered by Dan Stout and produced by Tinsley Ellis with Bruce Iglauer and Tim Kolleth as executive producers. Tinsley wrote all but two of the songs.

Track listing
 "Say Too Much"
 "Somebody"
 "Get to the Bottom"
 "You're Gonna Thank Me"
 "Tell the Truth"
 "Too Much of Everything"
 "Bringin' Home the Bacon"
 "Freeway Soul"
 "I Take What I Want" (Isaac_Hayes/David Porter/Mabon "Teenie" Hodges)
 "Sleep On It"
 "Stare at the Sun"
 "Shadow of a Doubt" (Gary Nicholson)

Musicians
Tinsley Ellis on guitar and vocals
The Evil One on bass guitar  
Jeff Burch on drums 
Kevin McKendree on keyboards  
Mike Lowry on guitar
Michelle Malone on background vocals

References

External links
Tinsley Ellis website

2007 albums
Tinsley Ellis albums